A sprocket is a profiled wheel with teeth.

Sprocket may also refer to:

Fictional characters
 Sprocket (comics), a Marvel Comics character
 Sprocket, a character in the television series Fraggle Rock
 Sprocket, a Tech character in Skylanders: Giants
 Sprocket, a child villain in Power Rangers Zeo
 Sprocket, an Ostrich villager in Animal Crossing

Other uses
 Sprockets (Saturday Night Live), a television comedy sketch on Saturday Night Live
 HP Sprocket, a Zink Paper printer
 Apple Macintosh Game Sprockets
 Spacely's Space Sprockets, the company George Jetson worked for on The Jetsons